Matsushige may refer to:

Matsushige, Tokushima, a town in Itano District, Tokushima Prefecture, Japan

People with the given name
, Japanese politician

People with the surname
Hideki Matsushige, Japanese guitarist
, Japanese photojournalist
, Japanese actor

Japanese-language surnames
Japanese masculine given names